The Planica7 (2018) was the first edition of Planica7, a four-day tournament for men in ski flying, held between 22–25 March 2018 in Planica, Slovenia. It will be part of the 2017/18 World Cup season final.

Competition

Format 
The competition will be held at Letalnica bratov Gorišek, Slovenia. It will last for four consecutive days with total of 7 rounds from individual events, team event and qualification round.

Host

Map

Results

Individual

Team

Standings

Planica7

References 

2018
2018 in ski jumping
2018 in Slovenian sport
March 2018 sports events in Europe